Michael Kort (born 1944) is an American historian, academic, and author who studies and has written extensively about the history of the Soviet Union. He teaches at Boston University.

Biography
Michael Kort was born in 1944. He received a B.A. in history from Johns Hopkins University, and an M.A. and Ph.D. in Russian history from New York University.

He lives in Massachusetts.

Bibliography

Biographies
Mikhail Gorbachev
Nikita Khrushchev

Textbooks
The Soviet Union: History, Culture, Geography
The Soviet Colossus: A History of the U.S.S.R., 1985
Modernization and Revolution in China (co‑author with June Grasso and Jay Corrin), 1991
The Columbia Guide to the Cold War, 1998
The Columbia Guide to Hiroshima and the Bomb, 2007

Other nonfiction
The Rise and Fall of the Soviet Union, 1992
Marxism in Power, 1993
A Brief History of Russia, 2008
The Vietnam War Reexamined 
Weapons of Mass Destruction
The Handbook of the Middle East
Russia (Nations in Transition)
Central Asian Republics (Nations in Transition)

Sources

Boston University faculty
Historians of Russia
Johns Hopkins University alumni
New York University alumni
Historians of the Soviet Union
20th-century American historians

1944 births
Living people